Arnold Miller Collins (1899-1982) was a chemist at DuPont who, working under Elmer Bolton and Wallace Carothers, first isolated polychloroprene and 2-chloro-1, 3-butadiene in 1930.

Personal 

Born 1899. Married Helen Clark Collins. Died October 8, 1982.

Education 

Collins attended Columbia College, graduating in 1921 with the AB degree.

Doctoral degree. Columbia College 1924.  His dissertation was entitled "Electrolytic introduction of alkyl groups", Columbia University, New York, New York.

Career 

At Dupont, Collins worked under Wallace Carothers.  Carothers assigned Collins to produce a sample of divinylacetylene. In March 1930, while distilling the products of the acetylene reaction, Collins obtained a small quantity of an unknown liquid, which he put aside in stoppered test tubes. He later found that the liquid had congealed into a clear homogeneous mass. When Collins removed the mass from the test tube, it bounced. Further analysis showed that the mass was a polymer of chloroprene, formed with chlorine from the cuprous chloride catalyst. Collins had stumbled upon a new synthetic rubber.

Following this breakthrough, DuPont began to manufacture its first artificial rubber, DuPrene, in September 1931. In 1936, it was renamed neoprene a term to be used generically.

Awards and Recognitions

 1973 - Charles Goodyear Medal from the ACS Rubber Division

External links 
 1981 Interview with Arnold Collins

References 

Polymer scientists and engineers
1899 births
1982 deaths
American chemists